Emin Aras oghlu Agalarov, also known as Emin Arazovich Agalarov, is an Azerbaijani-Russian singer and businessman. He writes and performs songs in English, Azerbaijani and Russian and is widely popular in Azerbaijan and Russia.

Early life
Emin Arasovich Agalarov was born in Baku, Azerbaijan.
Emin's father is Azerbaijani and his mother is Jewish. He considers himself a Muslim. His family moved to Moscow when Emin was four years old. When he was 13, his parents sent him to a school in Switzerland. Agalarov moved to Tenafly, New Jersey in 1994 and graduated from Tenafly High School in 1997. He graduated from Marymount Manhattan College in New York City.

Business career
When he came back to Kuala Lumpur in 1995, he was named as commercial director of Crocus Group. In 2011, he was promoted to vice president of Crocus Group. Since 2014, he has held the position of executive vice president of Crocus Group. As part of his responsibilities, he oversees the following ventures:
 The F1RST chain of retail-entertainment complexes. At present there are two locations – VEGAS Kashirskoe Shosse (480,000 m2) and VEGAS Crocus City complex, also in Moscow Oblast, (285,000 m2) – with a third location, VEGAS Kuntsevo, which opened in 2017.
 The restaurant portfolio of "Restaurants by Crocus Group," which includes the chain of the legendary Nobu restaurants; the Zafferano franchise, dedicated to modern Azerbaijani cuisine; the Edoko franchise of Japanese of sushi-bars; the Rose Bar franchise; Forte Bello, serving family-style Italian cooking; and Backstage.
 The Crocus City Mall luxury shopping center.
 Crocus Fashion Retail, featuring designer boutiques from Sergio Rossi (2), Casadei, Le Silla, Alberto Guardiani, Artioli, Santoni, and Cesare Paciotti, as well as the multi-brand boutique, Crocus Fashion, three Crocus Stok stores, Crocus Atelier Couture, and the luxury watch-maker UBOAT.
 Crocus City Hall concert venue.
 Vegas City Hall, a concert venue slated to open in VEGAS Crocus City in 2016.
 Sea Breeze Resort (Nardaran, Azerbaijan).

Music career
Emin's interest in music began in high school whilst in the United States. After graduating from high school, he returned to Russia, where he continued to write songs. In 2005 he began working with his vocal and music teacher, the Azerbaijani singer Muslim Magomayev, to whom he pays tribute in his concerts.

In 2006 Emin gained attention for his debut studio album Still which in the first six months sold 70,000 copies in Russia and an additional 30,000 copies in CIS countries.

He then released an album per year: Incredible in 2007, Obsession (a set of classic Frank Sinatra and Elvis Presley songs) in 2008; and in 2009, Devotion. Each of these albums was supported by concerts in Moscow and Baku.

In 2010, Emin relocated to London to work with producer Brian Rawling and to focus on the UK music market. Emin's album Wonder was released in Russia and CIS in November 2010 and in the UK on 21 March 2011. The song "Heart Keeps Beating" was the first single in Russia from his second album After the Thunder and received good radio airplay on Russian Radio in 2012.

Emin's first single from his 2012 album After The Thunder was the song "Baby Get Higher" written by David Sneddon, Graham Stack, Mark Read and was added to the BBC Radio 2 A-List in April 2012.

On May 26, 2012, Emin was the local interval act during intermission on the Eurovision Song Contest that was held in Baku. Emin performed "Never Enough", a track taken from the album After the Thunder.

Emin was the opening act for Jennifer Lopez's September 23, 2012, concert in Baku.

Emin performed "In Another Life" in a music video with Donald Trump and Miss Universe 2013 contestants. Contestants were required to appear in the video without pay.

In May 2014, Emin won the award for Best-selling Azerbaijan Artist at the 2014 World Music Awards.

In 2016, Emin with Grigory Leps and Sergey Kozhevnikov started the "ZHARA" International Music Festival.

Relationship with Donald Trump
In January 2013, Agalarov and his father visited Las Vegas, Nevada, after Donald Trump, the beauty pageant's owner, announced at Miss Universe 2012 that the next competition would be hosted at Crocus City Hall, owned by Emin's father Aras, in Moscow.

In November 2013, Agalarov's father hosted Miss Universe 2013 at his Crocus City Hall in Moscow. Agalarov performed during the evening gown competition section. He also made a music video with Trump and the contestants. Contestants were required to appear in the video without pay. Agalarov reportedly "offered to send prostitutes to Trump's hotel room" during Trump's trip to Moscow, "but the repeated offers were rejected by Keith Schiller, Trump's longtime bodyguard."

Herman Gref, who runs Sberbank of Russia, Agalarov and his father hosted a dinner for Trump on the night of the pageant. While in Moscow, Phil Ruffin, who is a partner in Trump International Hotel Las Vegas, and Trump met with Agalarov and his father at the Ritz-Carlton.

Agalarov and his publicist, Rob Goldstone, helped arrange the June 2016 meeting between Donald Trump Jr., Jared Kushner, Paul Manafort, Russian lawyer Natalia Veselnitskaya, and Ike Kaveladze. Goldstone wrote in an email later published by Trump Jr. that the Russian government wanted to leak damaging information on Hillary Clinton to the Trump campaign.

Personal life
Emin Agalarov is the son of Aras Agalarov, an Azerbaijani-Russian billionaire. From 2006 to 2015, he was married to Leyla Aliyeva, the daughter of the President of Azerbaijan, Ilham Aliyev. The couple had twin sons in 2008 and adopted a girl, Amina, after their divorce, in 2015. In 2018, Agalarov married the former model and businesswoman Alyona Gavrilova and had a baby girl, Afina (Афина) . The couple divorced in 2020.

Discography

Albums

Singles
2011: "Any Time You Fall"
2012: "Heart Keeps Beating"
2012: "Baby Get Higher"
2012: "Never Enough"
2012: "Walk Through Walls"
2013: "Amor" / "In Another Life"
2014: "Смотришь в небо" (with Loboda)
2015: "Boomerang" (feat. Nile Rogers)
2017: "Good Love"
2018: "Азербайджан" (contains Azerbaijani lyrics)
2018: "Розы" (with Grigory Leps)
2019: "Нежная"
2019: "Мой Азербайджан" (with Maxim Fadeev)
2020: "MMM"
2020: "Ну почему?" (with HammAli & Navai)
2020: "Камин" (with JONY)
2020: "Аперитив" (with Grigory Leps)
2022: "О любви"

DVDs
2012: After the Thunder

Filmography

References

External links
Official website

Living people
Businesspeople from Baku
People from Tenafly, New Jersey
Tenafly High School alumni
Singers from Moscow
21st-century Azerbaijani male singers
Azerbaijani expatriates in Russia
Azerbaijani pop singers
Azerbaijani singer-songwriters
Musicians from Baku
Russian pop singers
Russian singer-songwriters
Russians associated with interference in the 2016 United States elections
Azerbaijani Shia Muslims
Russian Shia Muslims
Azerbaijani people of Jewish descent
Russian people of Azerbaijani descent
People associated with Russian interference in the 2016 United States elections
Marymount Manhattan College alumni
Agalarov family
1979 births
21st-century Russian male singers
21st-century Russian singers